Emanuel "Manny" Ax (born 8 June 1949) is a Grammy-winning American classical pianist. He is a teacher at the Juilliard School.

Early life
Ax was born to a Polish-Jewish family in Lviv, Ukraine, (in what was then the Soviet Union) to Joachim and Hellen Ax. Both parents were Nazi concentration camp survivors.  Ax began to study piano at the age of six; his father was his first piano teacher.  When he was seven the family moved to Warsaw, Poland (where he studied piano playing at Miodowa school) and then two years later to Winnipeg, Manitoba, Canada, where he continued to study music, including as a member of The Junior Musical Club of Winnipeg. In 1961 the family moved to New York City and Ax continued his studies at the Juilliard School under Mieczysław Munz. In 1970 he received his B.A. in French at Columbia University and became an American citizen. The same year, he received an honorable mention at the VIII International Chopin Piano Competition in Warsaw. In 1973 he won the Young Concert Artists International Auditions.

Musical style
Ax is a particular supporter of contemporary composers and has given three world premieres in the last few seasons; Century Rolls by John Adams, Seeing by Christopher Rouse and Red Silk Dance by Bright Sheng. He also performs works by such diverse figures as Michael Tippett, Hans Werner Henze, Joseph Schwantner, Arnold Schoenberg and Paul Hindemith, as well as more traditional composers such as Haydn, Mozart, Beethoven, and Chopin.

Ax has been the main duo recital partner of cellist Yo-Yo Ma since August 3, 1973 when the pair performed its first public recital at the Marlboro Music School and Festival. They have recorded much of the cello/piano repertoire together. Ax also played quartets briefly with Ma and violinists Isaac Stern and Jaime Laredo. Before the quartet disbanded in 2001 due to the death of Stern, they recorded works for Sony by Brahms, Fauré, Beethoven, Schumann and Mozart. Ax is also a featured guest artist in a documentary film about the Toronto Symphony Orchestra and Peter Oundjian, Five Days in September; the Rebirth of an Orchestra.

In 1997, Ax was the music director of the Ojai Music Festival alongside the conductor Daniel Harding.

He holds honorary doctorates of music from Yale University (awarded in May 2007) and Columbia University. He is a recipient of Yale University's Sanford Medal.

Personal life
Ax lives in New York City with his wife, pianist Yoko Nozaki, and has two children. He converses in fluent Polish with his family at home.

Ax co-constructed the April 19, 2017 New York Times Crossword Puzzle and is one of the ambassadors to Music Traveler, together with Billy Joel, Hans Zimmer, John Malkovich, Sean Lennon, and Adrien Brody.

Discography
Partial Discography

1981:
Beethoven: Complete Sonatas for Cello and Piano, Vol. 1 (with Yo-Yo Ma)

1984:
Beethoven: Complete Sonatas for Cello and Piano, Vol. 2 (with Yo-Yo Ma)

1985:
Brahms: Sonatas for Cello and Piano (with Yo-Yo Ma)

1986:
Beethoven: Complete Sonatas for Cello and Piano, Vol. 3 (with Yo-Yo Ma)

1988:
Schumann: Cello Concerto | Fantasiestücke, Op. 73 | Adagio and Allegro, Op. 70 | Fünf Stücke im Volkston, Op. 102 (with Yo-Yo Ma)
Dvořák: Piano Trios (with Yo-Yo Ma and Young Uck Kim)
Shostakovich: Piano Trio | Cello Sonata (with Yo-Yo Ma)

1989:
Strauss and Britten: Cello Sonatas (with Yo-Yo Ma)

1990:
Brahms: The Piano Quartets (with Yo-Yo Ma, Isaac Stern, and Jaime Laredo)

1991:
Prokofiev and Rachmaninoff: Cello Sonatas (with Yo-Yo Ma)

1992:
Brahms: 'Sonatas for Cello and Piano (with Yo-Yo Ma)

1993:
Faure: Piano Quartets (with Yo-Yo Ma, Isaac Stern, and Jaime Laredo)

1994:Chopin: Chamber Music (tracks 1-9, with Yo-Yo Ma (tracks 1-9), Pamela Frank (tracks 1-4), and Ewa Osinska (track 10))Beethoven, Schumann: Piano Quartets (with Yo-Yo Ma, Isaac Stern, and Jaime Laredo)

1995:Brahms, Beethoven, Mozart: Clarinet Trios (with Yo-Yo Ma and Richard Stoltzman)

1996:
Lieberson: King Gesar; Corigliano:  Phantasmagoria (with Yo-Yo Ma (all tracks), tracks 1-7:  Omar Ebrahim, Peter Serkin, Andras Adorjan, Deborah Marshall, William Purvis, David Taylor, Stefan Huge, and Peter Lieberson)
Schubert: Trout Quintet; Arpeggione Sonata (with Yo-Yo Ma (tracks 1-8), Pamela Frank (tracks 1-5), Rebecca Young (tracks 1-5), Edgar Meyer (tracks 1-5), and Barbara Bonney (track 9))

1997:Mozart: The Piano Quartets (with Yo-Yo Ma, Isaac Stern, and Jaime Laredo)

1999:Dvořák: Piano Quartet No.2 | Brahms:  Sonata for Piano and Cello in D major, op. 78 (with Yo-Yo Ma, Isaac Stern (tracks 1-4), and Jaime Laredo (tracks 1-4))

2010:Mendelssohn:  Piano Trios and Songs without Words | Beethoven Ghost Piano Trio (with Yo-Yo Ma, Itzhak Perlman (tracks 1-8), Pamela Frank (track 14))

Awards and recognitions
 1972 – Seventh Prize, Queen Elisabeth Competition in Brussels.
 1974 – Arthur Rubinstein International Piano Master Competition in Tel Aviv
 1979 – Avery Fisher Prize in New York City
 2007 – Fellow of the American Academy of Arts and Sciences
2009 – Member of the American Philosophical Society
 2013 – Echo Klassik Award for Solo Recording of the Year (19th century music/Piano) for his Variations recording of works by Beethoven, Haydn and Schumann.
 Award of Excellence, The International Center in New York

Grammy Award for Best Chamber Music Performance:
Emanuel Ax and Yo-Yo Ma for Brahms: Cello and Piano Sonatas in E Minor and F (1986)
Emanuel Ax and Yo-Yo Ma for Beethoven: Cello and Piano Sonata No. 4 in C & Variations (1987)
Emanuel Ax, Jaime Laredo, Yo-Yo Ma and Isaac Stern for Brahms: Piano Quartets (Op. 25 and 26) (1992)
Emanuel Ax and Yo-Yo Ma for Brahms: Sonatas for Cello & Piano (1993)
Emanuel Ax, Yo-Yo Ma and Richard Stoltzman for Brahms/Beethoven/Mozart: Clarinet Trios (1996)

Grammy Award for Best Instrumental Soloist Performance (without orchestra):
Emanuel Ax for Haydn: Piano Sonatas, Nos. 32, 47, 53, 59 (1995)
Emanuel Ax for Haydn: Piano Sonatas Nos. 29, 31, 34, 35 & 49'' (2004)

See also
 List of Poles

References

External links

Official website
Discography at SonyBMG Masterworks
Emanuel Ax and Tom Kornberg: Scientist and Musician- Beethoven’s Cello Sonata No. 3 in A major, 1st movement
, WNCN-FM, April 16, 1982
Interview with Emanuel Ax by Bruce Duffie, April 15, 1999

1949 births
American classical pianists
American male classical pianists
Columbia College (New York) alumni
Fellows of the American Academy of Arts and Sciences
Grammy Award winners
Jewish American classical musicians
Jewish classical pianists
Jews from Galicia (Eastern Europe)
Juilliard School faculty
Piano pedagogues
Living people
Musicians from Lviv
Polish classical pianists
Polish expatriates in Canada
Polish emigrants to the United States
20th-century American pianists
21st-century classical pianists
20th-century American male musicians
21st-century American male musicians
21st-century American pianists
21st-century American Jews
Prize-winners of the Queen Elisabeth Competition